This article presents a non-exhaustive list of notable image-sharing websites.

Active image-sharing websites

Defunct photo-sharing websites
These also include sites that may still operate, but do not accept new users. Listed in chronological order of shutdown.

Comparison of photo-sharing websites
Legend:
 File formats: the image or video formats allowed for uploading
 IPTC support: support for the IPTC image header
 Yes - IPTC headers are read upon upload and exposed via the web interface; properties such as captions and keywords are written back to the IPTC header and saved along with the photo when downloading or e-mailing it
 Some - IPTC headers are read but information added via the web interface is not saved back to the IPTC header; or, IPTC headers are lost on resizing
 Tags/keywords: the ability to add to and search by tags or keywords
 Comments: the ability of users to leave comments on the photo
 Yes - full control over who can leave comments (friends, registered users, non-registered users)
 Some - users must register with the website to leave comments
 Rating:
 Yes - star rating: the ability to rate photos numerically, usually on a scale from 1 to 5
 Some - thumbs up/down rating, "mark as favorite", or a rating system accessible only to logged-in users
 Download originals:
 Yes - anyone can download the original photo
 Some - only photos of "pro" members can be downloaded
 Notes/annotations: the ability to overlay textual notes to areas of a photo
 Friendly URLs: human-readable URLs (e.g. /photos/greece_album/athens.jpg) vs. numeric identifiers (MemViewImage.asp?AID=5610943&IID=205062034&INUM=5&ICT=5&IPP=16)
 Subscriptions
 Some - RSS feeds and web interface
 Yes - RSS feeds, web interface, plus photo updates can be sent by e-mail to non-registered members

See also
 Comparison of photo gallery software
 Digital photo frame
 File hosting service
 File sharing
 Image hosting service
 Image sharing
 List of photo and video apps
 Timeline of file sharing

References

Dynamic lists
Lists of photography topics
Lists of websites
Online services comparisons